William Lambert (fl. 1529) was an English politician.

He was a Member (MP) of the Parliament of England for Old Sarum in 1529.

References

Year of birth missing
Year of death missing
English MPs 1529–1536